"World's on Fire" is a song and third single from the album Cultura by Gibraltarian Flamenco Metal band Breed 77. This was their first ever DVD release and just failed to hit the UK Top 40 by a small margin, securing a spot at number 43. However, it topped the official BBC Rock Chart at number 1.

The CD single also featured the debut of a brand new song; Tomorrow.

Track 1 written by Paul Isola, Danny Felice & Pedro Caparros. Track 2 (CD) written by Breed 77. Track 2 (DVD + Vinyl) written by Pete Chichone, Paul Isola & Danny Felice.

The line-up for this single consisted of: Paul Isola, Danny Felice, Stuart Cavilla, Pete Chichone and Pedro Caparros.

Track listing

 "World's on Fire"
 "Tomorrow" 
 "Un Lugar Seguro" (A Safe Place)

References

2004 singles
Breed 77 songs
Albert Productions singles
2004 songs